Zelenogorsk is the name of several inhabited localities in Russia.

Urban localities
Zelenogorsk, Krasnoyarsk Krai, a closed town in Krasnoyarsk Krai
Zelenogorsk, Saint Petersburg, a  municipal town in Kurortny District of the federal city of St. Petersburg

Rural localities
Zelenogorsk, Mari El Republic, a settlement in Zelenogorsky Rural Okrug of Morkinsky District in the Mari El Republic;